HeinrichsWeikamp, based in Germany, is a company that produces sports precision instruments for scuba diving including personal dive computers and oxygen partial pressure monitors for diving rebreathers.

Their products: OSTC, OSTC Mk.2, OSTC 2N, OSTC3, OSTC4 and Frog are supported by Subsurface, free software for logging dives authored by Linus Torvalds.

References

External links 
 HeinrichsWeikamp — Official site

Diving equipment manufacturers
Manufacturing companies of Germany
Companies based in Baden-Württemberg
Freiburg im Breisgau